George Nicoll Barnes  (2 January 1859 – 21 April 1940) was a British Labour politician and a Leader of the Labour Party (1910–1911).

Early life
Barnes was born on 2 January 1859 in Lochee, Dundee, the second of five sons of James Barnes, a skilled engineer and mill manager from Yorkshire, and his wife, Catherine Adam Langlands. His brother T. B. Barnes was also active in politics, later becoming a Labour Party councillor in Dundee. The family moved back to England and settled at Ponders End in Middlesex, where his father managed a jute mill in which George himself began working at the age of eleven, after attending a church school at Enfield Highway. He then spent two years as an engineering apprentice, first at Powis James of Lambeth then at Parker's foundry, Dundee.

After finishing his apprenticeship he worked for two years at the Vickers shipyard in Barrow before returning once again to the London area, where he experienced unemployment during the slump of 1879. He had a number of short-term jobs before settling for eight years at Lucas and Aird in Fulham.

Trade union and political involvement
During his time in London, Barnes became an active member of the Amalgamated Society of Engineers.  He stood for the general secretaryship of the union in 1895, but was narrowly defeated by the incumbent, John Anderson.  However, the following year, Anderson was dismissed for "wilful neglect of duty", and Barnes easily beat him in a new election. Barnes was a committed member of the co-operative movement, and a keen if moderate socialist, which led him to join the Independent Labour Party on its foundation in 1893.

Parliamentary career

At the 1895 general election he stood unsuccessfully for the Independent Labour Party in Rochdale.  He was elected as MP for Glasgow Blackfriars and Hutchesontown at the 1906 general election for the Labour Party, becoming one of the first two Labour MPs to be elected in Scotland. He sat for Blackfriars and Hutchesontown until the constituency was abolished for the 1918 general election, and thereafter sat for Glasgow Gorbals (which covered the same area) until he stood down at the 1922 election.

From high office to expulsion
Barnes was Leader of the Labour Party from 14 February 1910 to 6 February 1911. , he is the shortest-serving Labour leader, remaining in the post for only 11 months. He was Minister of Pensions (1916–1917), rising to Minister without Portfolio as one of David Lloyd George's powerful five member war cabinet (1917–1920). In 1918 the Labour Party decided to leave the Lloyd George Coalition but Barnes refused to resign. As a result, he was expelled from the Labour Party, and with the British Workers League founded the pro-coalition National Democratic and Labour Party, many of whose candidates were elected on the Coalition Coupon in December 1918. He also stood in 1918 under the Coalition Labour title.  As a reward for his loyalty, he was a participant at the Paris Peace Conference, he was instrumental in the creation of the International Labour Organization (ILO), he was a signatory to the Treaty of Versailles, he is featured in William Orpen's famous painting of the treaty signing (seated second from the right), and he was lionised in the iconic painting, "Statesmen of World War I" (standing directly above Winston Churchill).

Later life
After resigning as a minister early in 1920 he played no further significant role in British politics. In March 1920 he was appointed a Member of the Order of the Companions of Honour for his ministerial services. He quit politics when the Labour Party announced that it would again field a candidate against him in the general election of 1922. As it was clear that the tide would turn strongly towards the official Labour candidates throughout Glasgow, and as he had no wish to serve in any other party, he decided to withdraw from his seat.

Barnes had a long and active retirement, continuing to support the International Labour Organization, serving as chairman of the Co-operative Printing Society, and publishing several books, including his autobiography, From Workshop to War Cabinet (1923), and a History of the International Labour Office (1926). He was a pleasant-looking, mild-mannered man, but little is known about his private life. In 1882 he had married Jessie, daughter of Thomas Langlands, with whom he had two sons and a daughter; his youngest son was killed in action in France while serving as a Second Lieutenant with the Gordon Highlanders during the First World War.

In 1932, he became the first president of the pacific organization The New Commonwealth. He died in 1940 at his London home, and was buried in Fulham Cemetery.

References

Bibliography
 "Barnes, George Nicoll" in the Oxford Dictionary of National Biography

External links 
 

1859 births
1940 deaths
Politicians from Dundee
People from Ponders End
Amalgamated Engineering Union-sponsored MPs
Leaders of the Labour Party (UK)
Independent Labour Party parliamentary candidates
Scottish Labour MPs
Members of the Parliament of the United Kingdom for Glasgow constituencies
Members of the Order of the Companions of Honour
Members of the Privy Council of the United Kingdom
National Democratic and Labour Party MPs
UK MPs 1906–1910
UK MPs 1910
UK MPs 1910–1918
UK MPs 1918–1922
Coalition Labour MPs
General Secretaries of the Amalgamated Engineering Union
Members of the Parliamentary Committee of the Trades Union Congress
People from Lochee
Engineers from Dundee